Kristin's Christmas Past (previously entitled Last Chance Holiday) is an American comedy film directed by Jim Fall and written by Rachel Stuhler. Starring Shiri Appleby, Hannah Marks, Elizabeth Mitchell, Judd Nelson and Debby Ryan, the film premiered in the US on November 23, 2013, on Lifetime.

Plot 
Estranged from her family and alone on Christmas Eve, thirty-four-year-old Kristin (Shiri Appleby) wakes up Christmas morning seventeen years into her past to relive the worst Christmas of her life. Positioning herself as an older mentor to her younger self (Hannah Marks), Kristin now has a chance to change things – something that seems impossible, as her younger self is estranged from her mother, Barbara.

Cast 
 Shiri Appleby as Kristin Cartwell
 Hannah Marks as Kristin Cartwell (17 years)
 Elizabeth Mitchell as Barbara Cartwell
 Judd Nelson as Glenn Cartwell
 Debby Ryan as Haddie
 Will Kemp as Jamie
 Michael-James Olsen as Jamie (17 years)
 A. J. Langer as Debby
 Courtney Henggeler as Sophia
 Deniz Akdeniz as Maverick O’Dell

See also
 List of Christmas films

References

External links 
 
 

2010s Christmas comedy films
2013 television films
2013 films
American Christmas comedy films
Christmas television films
Films directed by Jim Fall
Lifetime (TV network) films
2013 comedy films
2010s English-language films
2010s American films